Brez dlake na jeziku is a musical album by Adi Smolar. It was published in March 2008. , the album has spent 31 weeks in the Slovenian Top 30 album list. Its best ranking on the list was the 4th place.

Tracks 
Najraje sem doma (4:09)
Resnico bom prenesu (4:22)
Le še iz navade (3:44)
Zlata ribica (3:11)
D'narja ni (2:53)
Brodolom (4:04)
Brez dlake na jeziku (4:06)
Bolj ko treniraš bolj ti gre (3:34)
Zgubu, zgubu (3:33)
Po dežju posije sonce (2:59)

2008 albums
Albums by Slovenian artists
Slovene-language albums